Bartholin's duct may refer to:
 Major sublingual duct, the largest excretory duct of the sublingual gland in the mouth.
 Ducts of the Bartholin's gland in the vagina.